Ridott Township is located in Stephenson County, Illinois, USA. At the 2010 census, its population was 1,451 and it contained 612 housing units. The villages of Ridott and German Valley are located in this township.

Ridott Township was named for an early settler.

Geography
Ridott is Townships 26 and 27 (part) North, Range 9 East of the Fourth Principal Meridian.

Stagecoach inns
Hunt's Tavern was built after 1842 by Thomas Hunt from Nottingham, England, along the Old State Road number 2, now U.S. Route 20. Frink, Walker & Company stage line, Chicago to Galena, used this road 1839 to 1854. The stone tavern burned in 1914.

Demographics

References

External links
City-data.com
Stephenson County official website

Townships in Stephenson County, Illinois
Townships in Illinois